Charikleia Sakkoula (born ) was a Greek female volleyball player. She was part of the Greece women's national volleyball team.

She competed with the national team at the 2004 Summer Olympics in Athens, Greece. She played with Panathinaikos in 2004.

Clubs
  Panathinaikos (2004)

See also
 Greece at the 2004 Summer Olympics

References

External links
http://www.cev.lu/Competition-Area/PlayerDetails.aspx?TeamID=1621&PlayerID=21555&ID=73
http://usatoday30.usatoday.com/sports/olympics/athens/results.aspx?rsc=VOW400A06
http://www.fivb.org/EN/Volleyball/Competitions/Olympics/2-Womens.pdf
http://www.fivb.org/EN/Volleyball/Competitions/WorldChampionships/2006/tournaments/women/WQ05GRE/Team_Roster.asp?code=GRE&sm=6
http://www.fanclub-dvv.de/index.php?dvv=webpart.pages.report.ReportViewPage&navid=14423&coid=8190&cid=15&

1973 births
Living people
Greek women's volleyball players
Place of birth missing (living people)
Panathinaikos Women's Volleyball players
Volleyball players at the 2004 Summer Olympics
Olympic volleyball players of Greece
Mediterranean Games silver medalists for Greece
Mediterranean Games medalists in volleyball
Competitors at the 2005 Mediterranean Games
Volleyball players from Athens